Dichomeris hoplocrates is a moth in the family Gelechiidae. It was described by Edward Meyrick in 1932. It is found on the Japanese islands of Hokkaido, Honshu, Shikoku and Kyushu.

Adults are similar to Dichomeris enoptrias, but the forewings are shining metallic leaden blue with well-developed broad longitudinal streaks running obliquely from the anterior margin at one-third to the tornus. There is also a small whitish strigula at three-fourths of the anterior margin.

The larvae feed on Duchesnea chrysantha, Rubus sieboldii and Rubus buergeri.

References

Moths described in 1932
hoplocrates